Swedish copyright law is regulated by the act from 1960 ('Swedish Act on Copyright in Literary and Artistic Works'). Like in most other countries, it grants the author or relevant copyright holders exclusive rights to the work for 70 years following the author's death.

History of copyright in Sweden dates back to the “Royal Act Regulating Book Printers” from 1752.

Court rulings of 2016 and 2017 effectively eliminated freedom of panorama in Sweden.

References

External links
Freedom of panorama in Sweden

Sweden
Swedish intellectual property law